Oswaldo Roberto Oliveira, usually known as Roberto Oliveira (born 1 January 1953) is a Brazilian football manager and a former player.

Roberto is where he has worked as a player and as a manager. Played soccer in the Noroeste, São Bento, Barretos and Vila Nova where was six times Campeonato Goiano. As a player, he was six times Campeonato Goiano by Vila Nova. Even in the State of Goias, already as a technician, won the State with the Atlético Goianiense and with the Vila Nova. In Tocantins, the commander led the  Campeonato Tocantinense in 2006, 2007, 2010 and 2011.

Honours

Player 
 Vila Nova
 Campeonato Goiano: 1977, 1978, 1979, 1980, 1982 e 1984.

Manager
 Atlético Goianiense
 Campeonato Goiano: 1988

Vila Nova
 Campeonato Goiano: 2000

 Araguaína
 Campeonato Tocantinense: 2006

Palmas
 Campeonato Tocantinense: 2007

Gurupi
 Campeonato Tocantinense: 2010, 2011

References

1953 births
Living people
People from São Carlos
Brazilian footballers
Footballers from São Paulo (state)
Esporte Clube Noroeste players
Esporte Clube São Bento players
Marília Atlético Clube players
Barretos Esporte Clube players
Vila Nova Futebol Clube players
Brazilian football managers
Vila Nova Futebol Clube managers
Atlético Clube Goianiense managers
Clube Náutico Capibaribe managers
Goiás Esporte Clube managers
Barretos Esporte Clube managers
Associação Atlética Anapolina managers
Itumbiara Esporte Clube managers
Goiânia Esporte Clube managers
São Carlos Futebol Clube managers
Associação Atlética Aparecidense managers
Palmas Futebol e Regatas managers
Gurupi Esporte Clube managers
Araguaína Futebol e Regatas managers
Interporto Futebol Clube managers
Association footballers not categorized by position